Packwood Glacier is located in the Goat Rocks region in the U.S. state of Washington.

Like the town of Packwood, the Packwood Glacier is named in honor of William Packwood.

See also
List of glaciers in the United States

References

Glaciers of the Goat Rocks
Gifford Pinchot National Forest
Glaciers of Washington (state)